Fargesia daminiu is a species of bamboo in the family Poaceae, native to Tibet. It is a clumping perennial reaching .

References

daminiu
Endemic flora of Tibet
Plants described in 2007